The Cape grassbird or Cape grass warbler (Sphenoeacus afer) is an African warbler found in southern Africa.

Taxonomy
Formerly placed in the family Sylviidae, it is the only member of the genus  Sphenoeacus. The taxonomy of the "African warblers", an assemblage of usually species-poor and apparently rather ancient "odd warblers" from Africa, is currently in a state of flux.

Etymology
Gr. sphen 'wedge'; oiax 'helm, rudder', in reference to the wedge-shaped tail

Description

The upperparts are brown with heavy streaking and the long tail is a lighter brown while the underparts are whitish with blackish spotting. The sexes are similar, but the juvenile has a streaked cap and is duller than the adult. The song is jangling and musical, and the call is a nasal pheeeo.

The long, pointed, straggly tail, chestnut cap and facial stripes are diagnostic of Cape grassbird. It is much larger than any cisticola, and the heavily streaked back and the pointed tail eliminate confusion with moustached grass warbler.

Distribution and habitat
The Cape grassbird breeds in southern Africa in South Africa, Lesotho, Mozambique and Swaziland with an isolated population in eastern Zimbabwe.  It is a common species of coastal and mountain fynbos and long, rank grass on mountain slopes or in river valleys.

Behaviour
The Cape grassbird builds a cup nest low in vegetation. This species is monogamous, pairing for life. Its eggs have one of the slowest rates of embryonic development amongst Southern African species.

The Cape grassbird is usually seen alone or in pairs, moving through vegetation foraging for insects and other small invertebrates.

Conservation status
The population size is believed to be large, and the species is not believed to approach the thresholds for the population decline criterion of the IUCN Red List (i.e. declining more than 30% in ten years or three generations). For these reasons, the species is evaluated as of least concern.

References

 Ian Sinclair, Phil Hockey and Warwick Tarboton, SASOL Birds of Southern Africa (Struik 2002)

External links
 Cape grassbird - Species text in The Atlas of Southern African Birds.

Cape grassbird
Birds of Southern Africa
Cape grassbird
Cape grassbird